Longispora albida is a bacterium from the genus Longispora which has been isolated from soil in Tokyo, Japan.

References 

Micromonosporaceae
Bacteria described in 2003